Miroslav Ilić (born 10 December 1950) is a popular Serbian folk singer-songwriter and philanthropist. He is known for his powerful vocals and emotional lyrics. With 25 albums, he is one of the best-selling performers in the history of Serbian music. Nicknamed 'Slavuj iz Mrčajevaca' (The Nightingale from Mrčajevci), he has worked together with several popular Serbian musicians such as Lepa Brena. In recent times, he has spoken out against the new generation of Serbian music videos, claiming that music videos are becoming more and more sexually suggestive and inappropriate for general audiences.

Discography
At the age of 22 years old, Ilić's first hit song was "I loved the girl from the city" composed by Obren Pjevović, a fellow countryman of Ilić, and authored by Dobrica Erić.

Pjevović first offered the song to Predrag Živković Tozovac and Predrag Gojković Cune, but they rejected it as non-commercial. After several major record companies refused to release it in 1972, Pjevović and Ilić accidentally on their way to the railway station in Belgrade passed by the representative office of Diskos record company and decided to approach to them. Although this song was not corresponding to contemporary modern trends, a manager from Diskos decided to take a big personal risk and release the song. Very soon after, it became one of the biggest hit folk songs in Belgrade and Serbia.

Singles
 Savila se vita grana jablana (1965)
 Vesna stjuardesa (1972)
 Razboleh se pod trešnjama (1973)
 Zori, zori, dan se zabjelio (1973)
 Selo moje, zavičaju mio (1973)
 Oj, Moravo zelena dolamo (1973)
 Gina (1973)
 Vragolan (1974)
 Hiljadu suza (1974)
 Daleko si sada (1975)
 Šta je život (1975)
 Šta bi htela kad bi smela (1976)
 Boem (1976)
 Jelena (1977)
 Ja ne igram kako drugi svira (1977)
 Vino točim a vino ne pijem (1978)
 Koliki je ovaj svet (1979)
 Otvor prozor, curice malena (1980) Duet with Dobrivoje Topalović
 Joj Rado, joj Radmila (1980)

Albums
 Ovom te pesmom pozdravljam (1973)
 Voleo sam devojku iz grada (1975)
 Sreli smo se, bilo je to davno (1979)
 Polomiću čaše od kristala (1979)
 U svet odoh majko (1980)
 Tako mi nedostaješ (1981)
 Shvatio sam, ne mogu bez tebe (1982)
 Kad si sa mnom ne misli na vreme (1983)
 Pozdravi je, pozdravi (1983)
 Putujem, putujem (1984)
 Jedan dan života (Duet album with Lepa Brena) (1985)
 Zoveš me na vino (1985)
 Tebi (1986)
 Misliš li na mene (1987)
 10 Godina sa vama aka Dan osviće a ja odlazim (1988)
 Balada o nama (1988)
 Lažu da vreme leči sve (1989)
 Šta će nama tugovanje (1990)
 Prošlost moja (1993)
 Naljutićeš me ti (1993)
 Amerika, Amerika (1993)
 Probudi se srce moje (1996)
 Bili smo drugovi (1996)
 Čuvajte mi pesme (1998)
 Lidija (1998)
 Što si rano zaspala (1999)
 Tek smo počeli (2001)
 Može li se prijatelju (2002)
 Eto mene (2004)
 Dajem reč (2005)
 Mani me godina (2010)
 Volim te neizlečivo (2014)

Filmography
 Sok od Šljiva (1981)

References

1950 births
Living people
Musicians from Čačak
Serbian folk-pop singers
20th-century Serbian male singers
Yugoslav male singers
Ss. Cyril and Methodius University of Skopje alumni
BN Music artists
Serbian folk singers
21st-century Serbian male singers